The Conservatoire for Dance and Drama is a higher education institution in the United Kingdom. It was founded in 2001 to bring together a number of schools providing higher-level vocational training in the performing arts. There are six member schools and two affiliate schools. These are:

Member schools

Bristol Old Vic Theatre School in Bristol
Central School of Ballet in London
London Contemporary Dance School
National Centre for Circus Arts in London
Northern School of Contemporary Dance in Leeds
Rambert School of Ballet and Contemporary Dance

Affiliate schools

 London Academy of Music and Dramatic Art (LAMDA) (former member)
 Royal Academy of Dramatic Art (RADA) in London

The Conservatoire offers undergraduate and postgraduate courses including dance (ballet, contemporary, choreography), drama (acting, directing, writing), production arts (stage and screen), and circus arts.

Each of the Conservatoire schools is a separate and distinct institution that employs its own teaching staff and remains legally autonomous. At the same time, students are registered jointly with the Conservatoire and the individual school.

The Conservatoire operates through a series of committees and working groups to determine policy for the schools as a whole. The schools themselves are involved at every level of deliberation within the Conservatoire, enabling them to share knowledge and expertise for the benefit of staff, students and the wider creative world that they serve.

The Conservatoire was placed eighth in the Guardian's University Guide 2019: Drama & Dance table.

References

External links

Performing arts education in the United Kingdom
Educational institutions established in 2001
2001 establishments in the United Kingdom